Theresa Cliff-Ryan (born June 19, 1978) is a road cyclist from the United States. She participated at the 2010 UCI Road World Championships and 2011 UCI Road World Championships.

References

External links
 

1978 births
American female cyclists
Living people
Place of birth missing (living people)
Inline speed skaters
21st-century American women
Pan American Games medalists in roller skating
Pan American Games gold medalists for the United States
Medalists at the 1999 Pan American Games